EUR Magliana is a railway station in Rome served by the Metro line B and the Ferrovia Roma-Lido in the EUR or Europa district of Rome. It was opened in 1924 as a Roma-Lido station for the Esposizione Universale Roma as Magliana (akin to the other stations opened at that time Torrino, Risaro, Acilia, Ostia Scavi and Marina di Ostia). It was later renamed Magliana Ostiense, then Magliana again and finally its present name.

The building has been repeatedly rebuilt. Its atrium is decorated by mosaics that have won the Artemetro Roma prize by Antonio Passa (Italy) and Tamás Lossonczy (Hungary). Next to it is a railway depot for both lines.

Surroundings 
 "Tre Fontane" sports complex of the Italian National Olympic Committee (CONI)
Abbazia delle Tre fontane
Palazzo della Civiltà Italiana (Palazzo della Civiltà del Lavoro o Colosseo Quadrato) by Giovanni Guerrini, Ernesto Bruno La Padula and Mario Romano
Palazzo dei Congressi
Basilica parrocchiale dei Santi Pietro e Paolo
Museo della Civiltà Romana
Obelisco Marconi

References

External links 

ATAC
Met.Ro S.p.A
Met.Ro S.p.A

Railway stations opened in 1924
Rome Metro Line B stations
1924 establishments in Italy
Rome Q. XXXII Europa
Railway stations in Italy opened in the 20th century